Zingarelli is a modern Italian monolingual dictionary.

Described as a Vocabolario della Lingua Italiana di Nicola Zingarelli, it is published annually by the Zanichelli publishing house.

The first edition is dated 1917.

References 

Italian dictionaries
1917 non-fiction books
it:Nicola Zingarelli#Il Vocabolario